The Kanchanaburi War Cemetery (known locally as the Don-Rak War Cemetery) is the main prisoner of war (POW) cemetery for victims of Japanese imprisonment while building the Burma Railway. It is on the main road, Saeng Chuto Road, through the town of Kanchanaburi, Thailand, adjacent to an older Chinese cemetery. The cemetery contains 6,982 graves of British, Australian and Dutch prisoner of wars of which 6,858 have been identified.

History 
The cemetery was designed by Colin St Clair Oakes and is maintained by the Commonwealth War Graves Commission. It is located near the former prisoner of war base camp of Kanchanaburi. There are 6,858 POWs buried there, mostly British, Australian, and Dutch. It contains the remains of prisoners buried beside the south section of the railway from Bangkok to Nieke (Niki Niki), excepting those identified as Americans, whose remains were repatriated.

There are 1,896 Dutch war graves, 5,085 Commonwealth graves and one non-war grave. Two graves contain the ashes of 300 men who were cremated after a cholera outbreak in Niki Niki. The Kanchanaburi Memorial gives the names of 11 from India who are buried in Muslim cemeteries.

Nearby, across a side road, is the Thailand–Burma Railway Centre about the railway and the prisoners who built it. There is also a Dutch Roman Catholic church nearby – Beata Mundi Regina.

Gallery

See also 
 Thanbyuzayat War Cemetery in Burma (Myanmar)
 Chungkai War Cemetery
 JEATH War Museum
 Thailand–Burma Railway Centre

References

External links

 
 Photographs from Kanchanaburi War Cemetery

Burma Railway
Kanchanaburi
Commonwealth War Graves Commission cemeteries in Thailand
World War II cemeteries
Cemeteries in Thailand
Buildings and structures in Kanchanaburi province
Tourist attractions in Kanchanaburi province